is a large, complex inlet that nearly cleaves in two the Japanese island of Tsushima. The bay is notable for its ria coastline, with many peninsulas and various small islands found in close proximity to the shore. It forms part of the Iki-Tsushima Quasi-National Park. Pearls are cultured and Japanese amberjack are farmed in its waters.

Manzeki Channel
The channel was cut by the Imperial Japanese Navy between 1895 and 1904. Initially twenty-five metres across and three metres deep, it was later enlarged to accommodate bigger vessels.

References

Bays of Japan
Landforms of Nagasaki Prefecture